KKCH (92.7 FM) is a radio station broadcasting a Hot AC format. Licensed to Glenwood Springs, Colorado, United States, it serves the Aspen area.  The station is currently owned by Patricia MacDonald Garber and Peter Benedetti, through licensee AlwaysMountainTime, LLC.

The radio station is rebroadcast on 94.1 MHz in Eagle, Colorado and 95.3 MHz in Aspen, Colorado and Vail, Colorado.

External links
Corporate Website

KCH
Radio stations established in 1987